Nouzerolles is a commune in the Creuse department in the Nouvelle-Aquitaine region in central France.

Geography
The Petite Creuse river forms all of the commune's southern border.

Population

Sights
 The fourteenth-century church.
 St. Antoine's chapel
 A fortified manorhouse.
 The remains of an eleventh-century tower and a castle.
 An old stone bridge crossing the Petite Creuse.

See also
Communes of the Creuse department

References

Communes of Creuse